Lena (Elizabeth Magdalena) Pedersen or Lena Pederson (born 1940, Greenland) is a politician and social worker from Nunavut, Canada. In 1959, she moved from Greenland to the Northwest Territories and lived in Coppermine (Kugluktuk), Pangnirtung and Rae (Behchoko) before moving to Cape Dorset where she participated in the artwork sales of the West Baffin Eskimo Co-operative.

Life and career
In the 1970 general election, Pedersen was the first woman elected to the Legislative Assembly of the Northwest Territories  representing the Central Arctic District The elections ordinance was amended to allow women the vote and run for office prior to the 1951 Northwest Territories general election. Pedersen was not the first woman to run, however, as Vivian Roberts was a candidate in the 1951 election.

In 1999 she was appointed by premier Paul Okalik to the Maligarnit Qimirrujiit, Nunavut's Law Review Commission. Prior to her appointment, she served as a board member for the Inuit Tapirisat of Canada and the Northwest Territories Housing Corporation, and as a drug and alcohol program coordinator for Kugluktuk.

In 2003 Northwest Territories general election she ran in Yellowknife Centre but was defeated.

The former Lena Pederson (Kitikmeot) Boarding Home in Yellowknife, that was used by patients from Nunavut's Kitikmeot Region while on medical travel, was named in her honour.

She was, at one time, married to Red Pedersen and their grandson, Calvin Pedersen was elected to the Legislative Assembly of Nunavut in July 2020.

Quote
Regarding the geographic move of the Northwest Territories government and the effect on Eskimo Co-operatives, Pedersen is quoted as saying:
"The NWT Government moved North in 1967 to get closer to the people," but "it has achieved only to get closer in miles to some communities.  It is still as far as or further removed from the people as it every  was."— Lena Pedersen, 1974

Partial bibliography

 Pedersen, Lena, and Donna Stephania. Crime Prevention in Kugluktuk. Ottawa: Caledon Institute of Social Policy, 1999.

References

External links
A lot of warmth in the Lena Pederson Boarding Home Nunatsiaq News September 24, 2004
Premier Paul Okalik appoints Maligarnit Qimirrujiit commissioners
Yellowknife Centre election results 2003 CBC
Still counting Woman electoral firsts list in Canada

Living people
1940 births
Members of the Legislative Assembly of the Northwest Territories
People from Behchoko
People from Kinngait
People from Kugluktuk
People from Pangnirtung
People from Yellowknife
Greenlandic emigrants to Canada
Canadian Inuit women
Greenlandic Inuit people
Women in Northwest Territories politics
Inuit from the Northwest Territories
Inuit from Nunavut